The 2007–08 season was Port Vale's 96th season of football in the English Football League, and fourth successive season in League One. Vale finished second-from-bottom, and were relegated, some twelve points from safety. Manager Martin Foyle left the club in September, and Lee Sinnott failed to improve results despite making several loan signings. Vale were also knocked out of the FA Cup at the Second Round by Southern Football League side Chasetown, a club five divisions below the Vale. Vale also had no luck in either the League Cup or the League Trophy, exiting both competitions at the first stage after a penalty shoot-out. Throughout the season the club saw a large turnover of players, as Sinnott attempted to build a squad of players of his own choosing to prepare for a promotion push the following season.

Overview

League One
The pre-season saw Martin Foyle sign Wolverhampton Wanderers defender Keith Lowe on a season long loan, and both Paul Edwards and Craig Rocastle from Oldham Athletic. He also signed Marc Richards from Barnsley, as well as Shane Tudor and Justin Miller from Leyton Orient. Calum Willock also joined on a short-term deal, as did Southampton loanee David McGoldrick, and Chester City's veteran defender Ashley Westwood. However an audacious attempt to land Liverpool legend Robbie Fowler failed.

The season started with just five points in the opening six games, with just one goal scored from open play. A few games into the season Akpo Sodje was sold to Sheffield Wednesday for an undisclosed fee. With only two disappointing mid-table finishes to his name, and with Vale lying 23rd in the league, Foyle left the club by mutual consent on 26 September. Caretaker-manager Dean Glover was disappointed with the players, comparing them to a pub team.
In October, Glover signed teenage midfielder Will Atkinson joined on loan from Hull City and left-back Adam Eckersley on loan from Manchester United. On 5 November, Farsley Celtic manager Lee Sinnott was appointed as the new Vale boss. This decision caused Dean Glover to consider his position at the club, though he eventually chose to remain as Sinnott's assistant. Sinnott warned of big changes at the club. Young defender Charlie O'Loughlin was then loaned out to Nantwich Town, and Shane Tudor was sent out on loan to Shrewsbury Town. Arriving at the club were midfielders Mark Salmon (Wolverhampton Wanderers) and Marc Laird (Manchester City) on short loan deals.

In January, goalkeeper Mark Goodlad was forced to retire due to injury, and young Joe Anyon faced criticism from the fans for his performances. Adam Eckersley then returned to the club after his release from Manchester United, as Sinnott's first non-loan signing. Sinnott then signed Dave Mulligan from Scunthorpe United on a short-term contract. Midfielder David Howland also arrived on loan from Birmingham City, and would join the club permanently at the end of the season. Fellow Birmingham player Krystian Pearce also signed on loan, though would impress enough to win a longer stay with Birmingham. Sinnott then raided another Birmingham club, this time Aston Villa, to bring Australian teenager Chris Herd on a one-month loan, as well as Swedish youngster Tobias Mikaelsson. He also allowed Rocastle to join Gillingham on a two-week loan. Sinnott also completed the signings of Chasetown pair Chris Slater and Kyle Perry, who left their jobs to become full-time professional footballers. In February, O'Loughlin was loaned out to Hinckley United. After the club lost a 2–0 lead at Victoria Park to lose 3–2 against Hartlepool United, club legend Jon McCarthy questioned the team's mental strength. In April, Craig Rocastle's contract was terminated by mutual consent, and he moved to play for Greek club Thrasyvoulos. Teenage goalkeeper Chris Martin made his debut on 19 April, as Vale were on the end of a 6–0 defeat by Swindon Town at The County Ground. Despite just two defeats in the final ten games of the season, Vale had long been relegated.

They finished in 23rd place with 38 points, above Luton Town only because the "Hatters" were hit with a ten-point deduction. Vale were twelve points behind Crewe Alexandra, who finished one place above the relegation zone. Luke Rodgers was the club's top scorer with twelve goals in all competitions. There was a distinct lack of goals in the side, though their goals conceded tally of 81 was the highest in the league.

At the end of the season there was an exodus of players: Robin Hulbert (Darlington); Colin Miles (Woking); Jason Talbot (Livingston); Mark McGregor (Altrincham); Joe Cardle (Airdrie United); Adam Eckersley (Horsens); Dave Mulligan (Wellington Phoenix); Justin Miller (Chelmsford City); Charlie O'Loughlin (Nantwich Town); as well as club captain George Pilkington (Luton Town). Sinnott claimed this cull was necessary to turn the club around. Danny Whitaker rejected Vale's contract offer, and their revised offer, to move off to Oldham Athletic. Player of the Year Paul Harsley also turned down a new deal, and instead signed with Chesterfield. Marc Richards discussed a £100,000 move to Cheltenham Town, though chose to stay in Burslem.

Finances
The club had to make monthly repayments of around £19,000 for a £2.25 million loan taken out from the local council in 2005. The club's shirt sponsorship came from Sennheiser.

Cup competitions
In the FA Cup, Sinnott's first cup game in charge saw Vale take revenge on Morecambe with a 2–0 win at Vale Park, to give the "Valiants" what seemed to be an easy Second Round tie with Southern League side Chasetown (an eighth tier team 101 league places below them). Vale sacrificed a one-goal lead over the amateurs to limp to a 1–1 draw at Vale Park, after conceding from a 40-yard free kick taken by trainee accountant Mark Branch. Chasetown then made a giant-killing with a late goal on their home ground, after Luke Rodgers missed two penalties.

In the League Cup, Vale exited at the First Round after losing to League Two side Wrexham 5–3 on penalties, following a 1–1 home draw.

In the League Trophy, Vale were beaten on penalties by a League Two side for the second time in the season, this time after a 2–2 draw with Morecambe at Christie Park. Caretaker-manager Dean Glover likened his side to a "pub team".

League table

Results
Port Vale's score comes first

Football League One

Results by matchday

Matches

FA Cup

League Cup

League Trophy

Player statistics

Appearances

Top scorers

Transfers

Transfers in

Transfers out

Loans in

Loans out

References
Specific

General
Soccerbase

Port Vale F.C. seasons
Port Vale